Besciva is a genus of moths in the family Gelechiidae.

Species
Besciva longitudinella Busck, 1914

References

Dichomeridinae